Brahmadesam  is an Indian Panchayat village located in Viluppuram taluk of Viluppuram district in the state of Tamil Nadu.  census, the village had a population of 1986, with a literacy rate of 59%. The two temples in the village Brahmapurisvara Temple and  Patalisvara Temple are among the Archaeological Survey of India's list of monuments.

References

Villages in Viluppuram district
Archaeological sites in Tamil Nadu